The Diagram 960 PMVs were a series of Parcels and Miscellaneous Van (PMV), previously designated Passenger Luggage Van (PLV), built by the South Eastern and Chatham Railway (SE&CR) from 1919. The prototype van was used to carry the bodies of Edith Cavell, Charles Fryatt, and The Unknown Warrior from Dover to London, and has been preserved by the Kent and East Sussex Railway. The SE&CR vans were known as the  Cavell Vans for this reason.

The Southern Railway constructed a number of similar vehicles to Diagram 3103, and further batches were turned out by British Railways until 1951. Both types saw revenue earning service until 1986, with some examples remaining in departmental service into the following decade. Several examples have been preserved.

Service history
The first PMV to Diagram 960 was built by the SE&CR at their Ashford Works in 1919, being numbered 132. A further 20 vans were built by the Bristol Carriage and Wagon Company in 1921, and 24 by the SE&CR at their Ashford Works in 1922. These took up vacant numbers between 121 and 182. All passed to the Southern Railway, who assigned them to Diagram 960; all were renumbered between 1925 and 1930, no. 132 becoming 1972, and the remainder became 1973–2016 in order of previous number.

Survivors

Diagram 960
SE&CR 132, the Cavell Van

The prototype van, originally SE&CR No.132, has been preserved on the Kent and East Sussex Railway (K&ESR). It was built at Ashford Works in 1919. The van was used to carry the bodies of Edith Cavell and Charles Fryatt in 1919, and that of The Unknown Warrior in 1920. After it had carried Edith Cavell's body, a cast iron plaque was affixed to the body of the van. The van was numbered 1972 by the Southern Railway. In August 1946, it was transferred to Departmental Stock and renumber 374S, being used to transport stores between Brighton Works and Lancing Carriage Works. The van was renumber DS374 by British Railways and was later used as a Staff and Tool Van by the Power Supply Section of BR(S). In October 1967 it was renumber 082757 in the Internal User number series. It was withdrawn from use at Guildford Cable Depot and put into store at Hoo Junction.

The van was purchased by the Tenterden Rolling Stock Group and delivered to Wittersham Road on the K&ESR on 22 January 1992. It was restored and entered into service in SE&CR livery. The van was allocated number 93 on the K&ESR stock list. In 1994 it was moved to the Rother Valley Railway (RVR) where it underwent a change of ownership and deterioration in condition. In 2003 a K&ESR member purchased the van, and it was moved back to K&ESR in 2004. In December 2009, an appeal was launched for £35,000 to restore the van, with completion scheduled for November 2010, 90 years after it carried the body of The Unknown Warrior.

SE&CR 152
No.152 was built in 1922 at Ashford Works. It was renumbered 1993 by the SR and later renumbered DS747. In 1984 it was preserved by West Glamorgan County Council. The van is currently on the Gwili Railway where it is in poor external condition although it was reroofed in 2001. The van was scrapped in 2013.

SE&CR 153
No.153 was built in 1922 at Ashford Works. It was renumbered 1994 by the SR, becoming S1994S under BR(S) and then DS70031 and DW70031. It was purchased by the Bluebell Railway in 1973 and has been restored to SE&CR livery. Used as a Mess Van, it sees occasional operational use on the railway.

SE&CR 154
No.154 was built in 1922 at Ashford Works. It was renumbered 1995 and then DS792 by the SR. It was purchased in 1976 by the Mid Hants Railway.

SE&CR 155
No.155 was built in 1922 at Ashford Works. It was renumbered 1995 then DS70165. In 1962 it was converted to a Control Train Generator Van. After withdrawal, the body was grounded at Ashford Works Crane Shop. Purchased in 1994 by Mangapps Farm Railway Museum where it serves as a store.

SE&CR 177
No.177 was built in 1922 at Ashford Works. It was renumbered 2012 then DS1035. It was purchased by the K&ESR in 1990 and used as a breakdown train van. Withdrawn from service in 2005 as it was in need of extensive floor repairs. Later moved to the RVR at Robertsbridge. In 2013 moved to the Bluebell Railway.

Diagram 3103
A large number of Dia. 3103 vans have been preserved.

Complete vans

Grounded bodies

Reused underframes

Notes

References
 

South Eastern and Chatham Railway
Southern Railway (UK)
British Rail coaching stock